Nu Eridani (ν Eri) is a star in the constellation Eridanus. It is visible to the naked eye with an apparent visual magnitude of 3.93. The distance to this star is roughly 520 light years, based upon an annual parallax shift of 0.00625 arcseconds. (Currently, the brightest star is Sirius at magnitude −1.46.)

This is a B-type subgiant star with a stellar classification of B1.5 IV. It is a hybrid pulsator variable, lying as it does on the overlapping instability strips for Beta Cephei variables and slowly pulsating B-type stars. The star shows at least fourteen pulsations frequencies, with nine that also display radial velocity variations. It has about nine times the mass of the Sun and six times the Sun's radius. Nu Eridani shines with 7,943 times the solar luminosity from its outer atmosphere at an effective temperature of 22,000 K.

References

B-type subgiants
Eridanus (constellation)
Eridani, Nu
Eridani, 48
029248
021444
01463
Durchmusterung objects
Beta Cephei variables
Slowly pulsating B stars